Lenny is an American sitcom which aired on CBS from September 10, 1990, until March 16, 1991. The series, a starring vehicle conceived for comedian Lenny Clarke, was created by Don Reo and produced by Reo's Impact Zone Productions, Witt/Thomas Productions and Touchstone Television.

Synopsis 
Lenny starred long-time Boston stand-up comedian Lenny Clarke as Lenny Callahan, a working-class Bostonian who held down two jobs, a daytime one as laborer for the local electric utility and an evening one as a doorman at a posh hotel.  His wife, Shelley (Lee Garlington) was a full-time homemaker and the couple had three children (presumably the reason Lenny needed to keep two jobs). One of their daughters, Kelly, was played by Jenna von Oÿ. Daughter Tracy was played by Alexis Caldwell.  Other characters included Lenny's brother Eddie (Peter Dobson), a get-rich-quick schemer, and their parents, Pat (Eugene Roche) and Mary (Alice Drummond).

Initially scheduled against two established programs, the Top 30 show The Wonder Years on ABC and the Top 20 hit Unsolved Mysteries on NBC, Lenny was a ratings failure and put on hiatus in October, as part of CBS' programming realignment that also involves the switch of The Flash, the delay of Sons and Daughters, and the cancellation of another sci-fi show E.A.R.T.H. Force, and the newsmagazine 48 Hours replaced the program. It was brought back in a new time slot in December, but cancelled permanently in March 1991.

Cast
Lenny Clarke as Lenny Callahan
Lee Garlington as Shelly Callahan
Peter Dobson as Eddie Callahan
Jenna von Oÿ as Kelly Callahan
Alice Drummond as Mary Callahan
Eugene Roche as Pat Callahan
Alexis Caldwell as Tracy Callahan

Episode list

References

External links 
 

1990s American sitcoms
1990 American television series debuts
1991 American television series endings
CBS original programming
English-language television shows
Television series by ABC Studios
Television shows set in Boston